Sva sreća general voli decu (Such Good Fortune, The General Likes Children) is the fifth studio album by the Serbian indie/alternative rock band Obojeni Program released by a Serbian independent record label B92 in 1999.

Track listing 
All music and lyrics by Obojeni Program.

Personnel 
The band
 Branislav Babić "Kebra" — vocals
 Tamara Dobler — vocals, backing vocals
 Dragan Knežević — guitar, backing vocals
 Slobodan Levakov — drums, tambourine, whistle
 Zoran Geratović — bass guitar
 Smokin' J. — remixes

Additional personnel
 Saša Stojanović — artwork [design] 
 AD Design Novi Sad — artwork [design]
 Vlada Žeželj — engineer [post-production]
 UrbaNS — executive producer
 Ilija Vlaisavljević "Bebec" — guitar, bass guitar, production
 Jan Šaš — recorded by
 Jovan Matić — recorded by [assistant]

References 
 Sva sreća general voli decu at Discogs
 EX YU ROCK enciklopedija 1960-2006, Janjatović Petar; 
 NS rockopedija, novosadska rock scena 1963-2003, Mijatović Bogomir, SWITCH, 2005

Obojeni Program albums
1999 albums